Evan Hooker (10 March 1901 – 1962) was an English footballer who played as a wing half for Stalybridge Celtic, Stockport County and Rochdale. He also played non-league football for various other clubs.

References

Oldham Athletic A.F.C. players
Stockport County F.C. players
Stalybridge Celtic F.C. players
Rochdale A.F.C. players
Ashton National F.C. players
People from Chadderton
1901 births
1962 deaths
English footballers
Association football midfielders